Thomas McShea was an Irish politician. He was an independent member of Seanad Éireann from April to August 1938. He was elected to the 2nd Seanad in April 1938 by the Labour Panel. He lost his seat at the August 1938 Seanad election.

References

Year of birth missing
Year of death missing
Members of the 2nd Seanad
Independent members of Seanad Éireann